André Kalenga Ntambue (born 16 April 1992) is a professional Dutch-Congolese football player who currently plays for KVK Ninove as a forward.

He has formerly played for various clubs in Belgium and Romania.

Career
André Ntambue played in the youth of FC Utrecht, Feyenoord and ADO Den Haag. At ADO Den Haag, he played in the U23 team and in the ADO Den Haag AV amateur team. In 2013 he went to Diegem Sport, which ended in the Third class. After a year and a half, he left for Romanian Ceahlăul Piatra Neamț, with whom he played in League 1. After half a season there, he played two seasons for Third-class clubs Géants Athois and FC Gullegem. In 2016 he left for KMSK Deinze, which ended in the Second Division. Through the reorganization of the Belgian competitions, Deinze relegated to first-class amateurs.

Pro career
Ntambue managed to play professionally for Belgian, Romanian and Swedish clubs namely Deinze, C. Piatra Neamț, Gullegem, Royal Géants Athois Diegem Sport with certain appearances. He has appeared in the Belgian and Romanian top flight Beloften Eredivisie and Liga I
In March 2015 Ntambue was on trail at Cheltenham Tonwn but was unable to join due to registration issues

References

1992 births
Living people
People from Kinshasa
Dutch footballers
Dutch expatriate footballers
Association football forwards
Netherlands youth international footballers
Liga I players
Eredivisie players
FC Utrecht players
Feyenoord players
ADO Den Haag players
K. Diegem Sport players
K.M.S.K. Deinze players
Landskrona BoIS players
CSM Ceahlăul Piatra Neamț players
Dutch expatriate sportspeople in Romania
Dutch expatriate sportspeople in Belgium
Dutch expatriate sportspeople in Sweden
Expatriate footballers in Romania
Expatriate footballers in Belgium
Expatriate footballers in Sweden